The Kate is an American public television music program recorded live at the Katharine Hepburn Cultural Arts Center in Old Saybrook, Connecticut. It is produced by  Public Broadcasting Service (PBS) member television station CPTV and is broadcast on PBS stations across the United States.

Concept
The Kate features musical performances filmed live at the 250-seat Katharine Hepburn Cultural Arts Center. The show features performers who perform a range of musical genres, including rock, pop, blues, jazz, and Broadway.

The show's co-creator and executive producer Jennifer Boyd looks for performers who are exploring new creative directions in their work. For example, the first season included performances from former Saturday Night Live cast member Ana Gasteyer who performed a nightclub act; Ann Wilson of Heart who explored a personal project called "The Ann Wilson Thing"; actress Rita Wilson who performed songs from an upcoming album; and Jarrod Spector whose performance traced the history of the falsetto from Enrico Caruso to Freddie Mercury.

Each season consists of six one-hour episodes. In addition to the musical performances, each episode features interviews with the performers and backstage footage.

A fifth season is in production and is scheduled to run in the spring of 2020. Guests in the 2020 season will include Delbert McClinton and The Wood Brothers.

Episodes

Season 1

Season 2

Season 3

Season 4

References

2016 American television series debuts
PBS original programming